Tan Thuan Heng (born 14 July 1948) is a Malaysian and Singaporean former swimmer and water polo player. He competed in four swimming events at the 1964 Summer Olympics for Malaysia. Later, he competed in the 1966 Asian Games and 1970 Asian Games for Singapore.

References

External links
 

1948 births
Living people
Singaporean male water polo players
Singaporean male freestyle swimmers
Malaysian male swimmers
Olympic swimmers of Malaysia
Swimmers at the 1964 Summer Olympics
Place of birth missing (living people)
Asian Games medalists in water polo
Water polo players at the 1966 Asian Games
Swimmers at the 1966 Asian Games
Asian Games silver medalists for Singapore
Medalists at the 1966 Asian Games
Asian Games bronze medalists for Singapore
Swimmers at the 1970 Asian Games
Medalists at the 1970 Asian Games
Asian Games medalists in swimming
Southeast Asian Games medalists in swimming
Southeast Asian Games gold medalists for Singapore
Southeast Asian Games silver medalists for Singapore
Southeast Asian Games bronze medalists for Singapore
Competitors at the 1971 Southeast Asian Peninsular Games
Competitors at the 1975 Southeast Asian Peninsular Games